Anoush Dastgir (born 27 November 1989) is an Afghan football manager and retired player, who is the current head coach of both the Afghanistan national team and VV DUNO in Hoofdklasse.

Early life
Dastgir, born in Afghanistan, grew up in Pakistan and India due to his father being a political refugee before settling in the Netherlands.

Coaching career

Afghanistan
On July 10, 2018, Dastgir was announced by the Afghanistan Football Federation as the new head coach of the Afghanistan football team succeeding Otto Pfister.

References

External links 
 

1989 births
Living people
Afghan men's footballers
Afghanistan international footballers
Association football midfielders
Afghan emigrants to the Netherlands
Afghan expatriate sportspeople in the Netherlands
FC Lienden players
Footballers from Kabul
VV Capelle players
Afghanistan national football team managers